On Giant's Shoulders is a 1979 BBC television film about the early life of thalidomide victim Terry Wiles, with Wiles playing himself. The drama also starred Bryan Pringle and Judi Dench and won an Emmy Award in 1980.

Based on a 1976 book of the same name by Marjorie Wallace and Michael Robson, the 90 minute film was first shown on BBC2 on 29 March 1979 as the 'Play of the Week', and was written by William Humble and Anthony Simmons; the latter was also the director. Terry Wiles had never acted before and, as he was then 17, his voice had to be dubbed by a child actor after filming as it had broken and he had to appear to be much younger, playing himself from age 9 to 12.

The drama tells the story of Terry Wiles, who was born with severe disabilities following his mother's use of the sedative thalidomide, prescribed at that time for morning sickness, during her pregnancy. Abandoned by his mother at birth, he is later adopted from a children's home by the middle-aged and childless couple Hazel (Judi Dench) and Len Wiles (Bryan Pringle). The couple quickly adjust to caring for so severely disabled a child, and Len Wiles develops a series of motorised wheelchairs (or 'Supercars') based on the forklift truck, so that Terry can live as independent a life as possible. Eventually, through the love and care of his adoptive parents Terry adjusts to life in the normal world and attends school with able-bodied pupils for the first time.

Judi Dench was nominated for a Best Actress BAFTA for her role as Hazel Wiles.

Cast
 Terry Wiles - Himself
 Len Wiles - Bryan Pringle
 Hazel Wiles - Judi Dench
 Sister Page - Hilda Braid
 Mrs Proctor - Anna Wing
 Teacher at Hospital - Barbara Young
 Len Curry - Tim Wylton
 Café cashier - Barbara Keogh
 Solicitor - Frank Barrie
 Hospital Administrator - Tony Church
 Marjorie Wallace - Annabel Leventon
 Registrar - Elizabeth Morgan
 Limb Technician - Anthony Heaton
 Miss Hudson - Jean Rimmer

References

External links

Website about 'On Giants's Shoulders' the 1979 film of the life of Terry Wiles
BBC 'Play of the Week' entry for 'On Giant's Shoulders' (1979)
'Time Magazine' review of 'On Giant's Shoulders'
Excerpt from Judi Dench's biography dealing with On Giant's Shoulders

British television films
1979 television films
1979 films
International Emmy Award for Drama winners